This is a list of academic journals published by Sri Lankan universities.

University of Colombo

The Ceylon Journal of Medical Science 
Colombo Business Journal -  Faculty of Management and Finance 
International Journal of Advance in ICT for Emerging Regions (ICTer) <ref name="ICTer Website">{{Cite web | title = International Journal of Advance in ICT for Emerging Regions (ICTer)|  accessdate = 2015-06-01 | url =http://icter.sljol.info/ }}</ref>Sri Lanka Journal of International Law — Faculty of Law, University of Colombo Student Medical Journal – Faculty of MedicineUniversity of Colombo Review Colombo Law Review - Faculty of Law
The Colombo Law Journal (Student Journal) Faculty of Law

Eastern University, Sri Lanka

AGRIEST — journal of agricultural sciences
Journal of Science — Faculty of Science

University of Jaffna
Journal of Business Studies - Faculty of Management Studies and Commerce

Open University of Sri Lanka
Journal of Engineering and Technology
OUSL Journal 
VISTAS Journal — Faculty of Humanities, Social Sciences

University of Kelaniya
Journal of Humanities-Faculty of Humanities
Journal of Science — Faculty of Science
Journal of Social Sciences-Faculty of Social Sciences
Kalyani Journal of University of Kelaniya -University of Kelaniya 
Kelaniya Journal of Human Resource Management — Department of Human Resource Management
Kelaniya Journal of Management - Faculty of Commerce & Management Studies
Sri Lanka Journal of Marketing — Department of Marketing Management

University of Moratuwa
Bhumi - the planning research journal of University of Moratuwa, Department of Town & Country Planning
Journal of the University Librarians Association of Sri Lanka

University of Peradeniya
The Ceylon Journal of Historical and Social Studies
Ceylon Science Journal (Biological Sciences) - Faculty of Science
Modern Sri Lanka Studies
The Sri Lanka Journal of the Humanities
University of Ceylon Review
Sri Lanka Journal of Forensic Medicine, Science & Law - Department of Forensic Medicine, Faculty of Medicine

Rajarata University of Sri Lanka

Rajarata Journal of Social Sciences — Department of Social Sciences

Rajarata University of Sri Lanka

Journal of Management Matters — Faculty of Management Studies

University of Ruhuna

International Journal of tropical Agricultural Research & Extension
Faculty Journal of Humanities and Social Sciences
Rohana - research journal of the University of Ruhuna
Ruhuna Journal of Management and Finance (RJMF)
Ruhuna Journal of Science
 Social Sciences and Humanities Review
 "Prathimana"; Ruhuna Journal of Sociology

Vimarshi; Sociological Journal
Ghanagaweshi; journal of Buddhist Philosophy

Sabaragamuwa University of Sri Lanka

Journal of Agricultural Sciences
Sabaragamuwa University Journal
South Asian Journal of Tourism and Hospitality

South Eastern University of Sri Lanka

The Journal of Kalam
Journal of Management

Bhiksu University of Sri Lanka

Pravachana:The Journal of Bhiksu University of Sri Lanka

University of Sri Jayewardenepura

Journal of Tropical Forestry and Environment — Department of Forestry and Environmental Science
Sri Lankan Journal of Human Resource Management — Department of Human Resource Management, Faculty of Management Studies and commerce
Sri Lankan Journal of Real Estate — Department of Estate Management and Valuation
Vidyodaya Journal of Management
Vidyodaya Journal of Social Science

Wayamba University of Sri Lanka
Applied Economics & Business — Department of Agribusiness Management
Journal of Food and Agriculture — Faculty of Agriculture and Plantation Management and Faculty of Livestock Fisheries and Nutrition 
Sri Lankan Journal of Banking and Finance — Department of Banking and Finance
 Wayamba Journal of Animal Science - Department of Livestock and Avian Sciences
Wayamba Journal of Management — Department of Business Management
Journal of Insurance and Finance — Department of Insurance and Valuation

References

External links
The Ceylon Journal of Medical Science website
International Journal of Advance in ICT for Emerging Regions (ICTer) website

Sri Lankan universities
Academic journals published by university presses
Research in Sri Lanka

journals